Lijia Subdistrict is a township-level division of the Shahekou District of Dalian, Liaoning, China. , there are twelve residential communities within the subdistrict:

Communities:
Wenyuan Community
Fuyuan Community
Lübo Community
Lüxiang Community
Jinyuan Community
Jinyun Community
Jinxia Community
Jinhong Community
Jinhua Community
Lüyuan Community
Lüjing Community
Jinxiu Community

See also
List of township-level divisions of Liaoning

References

External links
李家街道党建网 

Dalian
Township-level divisions of Liaoning
Subdistricts of the People's Republic of China